Jordan Steckler (born July 16, 1996) is an American football offensive tackle who is a free agent. He played college football at Northern Illinois.

Career 
He attended he Two Rivers High School, in Wisconsin and played football for them. He was an all-state honorable mention selection by coaches. He was also a standout basketball player for the Raiders, high school team. From 2016 to 2019, Steckler played at Northern Illinois University for four season. He started 43 games and appeared in 47 during his four-year career. In the 2018 MAC Championship game, Steckler was part of an offensive line that led the NIU offense to 20 second-half points in a comeback win over Buffalo Bills.

In April 2020, Steckler signed as a college free agent with the New Orleans Saints. After spending the offseason with the Saints, he was signed to the New England Patriots practice squad for Weeks 8 through 17.

On October 5, 2021, he was signed to the Houston Texans practice squad. He signed a reserve/future contract with the Texans on January 11, 2022.

On August 30, 2022, Steckler was waived by the Texans and signed to the practice squad the next day.

References

1996 births
Living people
People from Two Rivers, Wisconsin
Players of American football from Wisconsin
American football offensive tackles
Northern Illinois Huskies football players
Houston Texans players